Invitation to the Dance is a 1956 dance anthology film consisting of three distinct stories, all starring and directed by Gene Kelly. It was the first film Kelly directed on his own, after co-directing three films with Stanley Donen.

The film is unusual in that it has no spoken dialogue, with the characters performing their roles entirely through dance and mime. Kelly appears in all three stories, which feature leading dancers of the era, including Tommy Rall, Igor Youskevitch, Tamara Toumanova and Carol Haney.

The film's shooting was completed in 1954, but its release was delayed until 1956 because of doubts at Metro-Goldwyn-Mayer. The movie performed poorly at the  box office, and it generally is regarded as an artistic as well as commercial failure.

The film takes its name from a piano composition of the same name by Carl Maria von Weber, portions of which are played during the opening credits.

Plot

"Circus" 
The first segment, set to original music composed for the film by Jacques Ibert, is a tragic love triangle set in a mythical land sometime in the past. Kelly plays a clown, who is in love with another circus performer, played by Claire Sombert. She, however, is in love with an aerialist, played by Youskevitch. The clown, after entertaining the crowds with the other clowns, sees his love and the aerialist kiss, and then wanders into a crowd in shock. That night, he watches them dance together, and after the lady finds him with her shawl, he confesses his love to her. The aerialist finds them and thinks she has been unfaithful and leaves her. The clown sees her affection for the aerialist.

Determined to win her, the clown tries to walk the aerialist's tightrope, only to fall to his death. Dying, he urges the two lovers to forgive each other.

"Ring Around the Rosy" 
The second segment, named after the nursery rhyme "Ring Around the Rosy" was based upon Arthur Schnitzler's La Ronde, and it is set to original music by André Previn, who is off-camera at the piano. It tells romantic stories tied by the exchange of a gold bracelet. The bracelet originally is given by a husband (David Paltenghi) to his flirtatious and apparently unfaithful wife Daphne Dale. She gives it to her paramour, an artist (Youskevitch), at a party. The husband sees this and stalks off. The artist gives the bracelet to a model (Claude Bessy), who gives it to her boyfriend the Sharpie (Tommy Rall), who is introduced giving an acrobatic dance at a stage door. He in turn gives it to the femme fatale (Belita), only to have her present it to a crooner (Irving Davies) after his performance. He gives the bracelet to a hatcheck girl (Diana Adams) She returns home to her boyfriend, a marine (Kelly).

When the marine sees the bracelet, he angrily takes it and storms out. Coming out of a bar, he encounters a streetwalker (Tamara Toumanova) and dances with her, giving her the bracelet before walking off again. The husband encounters the streetwalker and sees the bracelet. He buys it from her and reunites with his wife, returning it to her.

"Sinbad the Sailor" 
The third segment takes its name from a fictional character. It is a fantasy consisting of live action and Hanna-Barbera-directed cartoons set in the casbah of a Middle Eastern country. Kelly plays a sailor who is sold a magic lantern. Rubbing the lamp, he discovers a childlike genie (David Kasday). Put off by the genie at first, the sailor soon befriends him and changes his clothes into a miniature sailor suit to match his. The genie uses his magic to transport them both inside a book of One Thousand and One Nights. This puts him in conflict with a cartoon dragon, and then two palace guards wielding swords, and falling in love with a cartoon harem girl. With the genie's help, he defeats the two guards by out-dancing them. The harem girl then joins him and the genie after the latter changes her clothes into a women's naval uniform. The film ends with the three of them as they dance into the distance together.

This segment includes complex dance sequences showing a live Kelly dancing with cartoon characters in the picture. Use is also made of the original themes of Nikolai Rimsky-Korsakov's Scheherazade by the MGM music department team of adapter Roger Edens, conductor Johnny Green and orchestrator Conrad Salinger.

Cast 
 Gene Kelly -  Pierrot / The Marine / Sinbad
 Igor Youskevitch - The Lover / The Artist
 Claire Sombert - The Loved
 Claude Bessy - The Model
 Tamara Toumanova - The Streetwalker
 Diana Adams - Hat Check Girl
 Tommy Rall - The Sharpie
 Belita - The Femme Fatale
 David Paltenghi - The Husband
 Daphne Dale - The Wife
 Irving Davies - The Crooner
 Carol Haney - Scheherazade
 David Kasday - The Genie

Production
Kelly had gone to England for tax reasons, and Invitation to the Dance was one of three films that he made there. From the beginning, he intended it to be an all-dance film with no dialogue. This concept caused apprehension at MGM, because "dance, particularly ballet, was then considered longhair at best, homosexual at worst." Kelly initially had not wanted to appear in any of the segments because he "wanted to show the world that other people danced besides himself and Fred Astaire," but he was forced by the studio to appear in the film himself.

The movie began filming on August 19, 1952 at MGM studios in London and continued there until December 19, with shooting also taking place at MGM in California in October 1952. Shooting continued into 1953 on the "Sinbad" sequence, which made it MGM's second longest shooting schedule at the time. MGM announced in March 1954 that the sequence would be completed by June 15, 19 months after filming began.

Difficulties arose during production of the "Rng Around the Rosy" segment. The original score, by British composer Jojhn Addison, was not judged suitable, and "the ballet was finished to bits of the Addison score and counts," with Andre Previn brought in to "tack the music onto the existing choreography."

The film originally was designed to have four segments, ending with "Sinbad." A 28-minute third segment titled "Dance Me a Song" was filmed. It consisted of popular songs interpreted through dance. The songs would have included "They Go Wild, Simply Wild About Me," "The Wiffenpoof Song," "Sunny Side of the Street," Wedding Bells Are Breaking Up That Old Gang of Mine," and "Sophisticated Lady." This sequence was filmed, but later cut.

The film was planned to be released in 1954, but it was not viewed favorably by MGM and was not released until May 1956. New York Times critic Clive Barnes later observed that "when it was let out, gave it fanfares that would be appropriate to the birth of a mouse, not even a cartoon mouse at that," and was "distributed desultorily." It was exhibited in Great Britain as a 62-minute feature composed of the first two segments. According to author Larry Swindell, the film "was effectively thrown away by MGM because it didn't know how to market it."

Reception
At the time of its release in May 1956, Invitation to the Dance was not well-received by critics. His choreography was described by reviewers as the weakest aspect of the film. Dance Magazine critic Arthur Knight criticized Kelly's "artistic pretensions" and wrote that the Kelly's choreography "rarely rises about the obvious."

The New York Times film critic Bosley Crowther wrote the idea of an all-dance, no-dialogue film was "exciting and refreshing," but called the film "a jumble of stories and styles." Crowther added that Kelly was "not a particularly imaginative choreographer...his story ideas are somewhat hackneyed and his dances are too elaborate." However, he praised Kelly for "having the urge and nerve to try this film."

Time]]s critic wrote the Sinbad sequence indicated that "Hollywood just cannot bring itself to bring the art before the coarse," and  New York Daily News critic Wanda Hale wrote that the film would have difficulty appealing to a wide audience and said that "since this arty experiment is out of his system, I hope [Kelly] will leave selection of his vehicles to MGM."

The film was a financial failure. According to MGM records, it earned $200,000 in the U.S. and Canada and $415,000 in other markets, recording a loss of $2,523,000 and making it the studio's biggest flop of the year. Kelly's later stated that "the public wasn't ready for a serious dance film, and besides, by the time it came out, the popularity of film musicals had declined."

Awards 
The film won the Golden Bear for Best Film at the 6th Berlin International Film Festival.

Legacy 
Invitation to the Dance generally is viewed as not among Kelly's better work. It was rarely revived or shown on television in the years after its release.  

Writing in the New York Times in 1977, dance critic Clive Barnes wrote that the film was Kelly "at his most pretentious and least convincing...the choreography throughout is shallow and facile, and the long‐awaited cartoon segment little but a tiresome gimmick". At the same time, he wrote "the movie is required watching for everyone interested in movies, in dance or, for that matter, simply in the career of Gene Kelly,' because Invitation to the Dance "was a watershed movie, which even now demands to be seen." He pointed out that the film was more ambitious than The Red Shoes because it had no unifying plot, and because it featured an international cast of dancers who were mostly not used to film work. he added "because at his own level [Kelly] understands dance in way very few directors have ever understood dance, even in Invitation to the Dance he can devise some really beautiful and arresting shots cinematically a pure joy."

See also
List of American films of 1956

References

External links 
 
 
 

1956 films
1950s musical films
1950s musical comedy films
American dance films
American fantasy films
American musical comedy films
American musical drama films
American films with live action and animation
American anthology films
Films directed by Gene Kelly
Films without speech
Golden Bear winners
Metro-Goldwyn-Mayer films
Films produced by Arthur Freed
1950s American animated films
Films scored by Jacques Ibert
Films scored by André Previn
1956 comedy films
Metro-Goldwyn-Mayer cartoon studio films